Bobby Sessions is an American Grammy Award winning rapper, songwriter, recording artist and producer. He wrote and performed the title track for the film, The Hate U Give. Since signing a deal with Def Jam Recordings in 2018 he has gained notoriety by using his platform to advocate for civil and criminal justice reform. He has performed at the BET Hip Hop Awards, the Fader Fort at SXSW, and the Fortress Festival, among others.  He has shared the stage with PRhyme,Billie Eilish, and Erykah Badu, among others. His song, Savage, co-written and performed by Megan Thee Stallion and Beyoncé, won a Grammy Award for Best Rap Song in 2021 as well as peaking at #1 on Billboard's Hot 100 chart in 2020.

In 2021, Sessions teamed up with Marvel writers to create his own character-specific special collaboration designed to integrate the voices of young black creative's short stories for Ta-Nehisi Coates final three issues of Black Panther with Sessions contributing to issue 24.

Early life
Bobby Sessions was born and raised in Pleasant Grove, Dallas Texas, a predominantly Black, low-to-lower middle income neighborhood where he spent much of his childhood then he and his family relocated to Rowlett, a suburb northeast of Pleasant Grove.  He began writing hip-hop songs as a teenager and would freestyle in class and in the locker room before football practice.  His father's love of jazz and soul music greatly influenced his passion for music.

Sessions played basketball, football, and ran track, which he attributed to his competitive edge in his music career.  Football played a large role in his youth, teaching him about teamwork..  When asked about his stage name Sessions said that his real name is Bobby Session Jr., "I got it from my father, because I’m a junior. It’s my real name, the only difference is the added ‘s’ at the end.  I can tell somebody my name’s Bobby Session a million times, they still say it back with an extra ‘s’. When I decided on my stage name, I did the work for them so they don't have to worry about it."

Music career
Sessions is a recording artist, rapper, songwriter, and producer based out of Dallas, Texas.  He was born in Pleasant Grove, Texas where he spent most of his childhood and later moved with his family to Rowlett, Texas.  While attending the University of North Texas, where Sessions was studying philosophy and journalism, he began honing in on his rapping skills at a student led organization called, Poetic Justice. He has cited Jay Z, Eminem, Tupac, Kanye West, and Pharrell as his major influences.

He became active in the rap/hip-hop community performing with the Brain Gang (also known as The Rowdy Bunch) in Deep Ellum in Dallas, known for its music scene.  The group sold-out venues and was known for its element of rage (punk rock style), mosh pits, and jumping. Sessions worked at Walmart and the U.S. Postal Service while playing in clubs in the Dallas area establishing a name for himself.  He quit his job in 2014 with only $50 in his bank account to pursue his music career full-time.

In 2015, Sessions signed a record deal with High Standardz and released his debut album, LOA (Law of Attraction) which was listed as the "Best Album of 2015" by the Dallas Observer. His 2017 sophomore release, Grateful, earned him "Best Rap/Hip-Hop Act" at the Dallas Observer Music Awards as well as single Dollars & Sense winning "Best Rap Song".

In 2018, Session's manager, J Dot (Jeremy Jones), played early versions of Session's RVLTN Chapter 1: The Divided States of AmeriKKKa for the-then new CEO of Def Jam Recordings, Paul Rosenberg.  Sessions was the first artist that Rosenburg signed.  He wrote and performed the title track for the soundtrack, The Hate U Give, which includes songs by Kendrick Lamar, Pusha T, Logic, and Tupac. He was asked by his label to write the song as his cousin, James Harper, was shot and killed by a police officer in 2012 in South Dallas, Texas. 911 had received a call reporting an armed kidnapper which was later determined to be a hoax. The case was highly controversial as Harper was unarmed and shot three times. No charges were brought against the officer.

Sessions' involvement in Deep Ellum's (Dallas) music scene, community, and years of live performances was celebrated by a mural painting of him in Deep Ellum by artist JD Moore, commissioned by the Deep Ellum Foundation in 2019.

In 2020, Sessions' co-write Savage, co-written and performed by Megan Thee Stallion and Beyoncé, peaked at #1 on Billboard's Hot 100 chart which led to a publishing deal with Sony Music Publishing.  Savage won a Grammy Award for Best Rap Song in 2021, was listed on the Rolling Stone's 500 Greatest Songs of All Time, and was certified 4× Platinum. Savage and Savage remix won awards for the Most Performed Songs of the Year at the 2021 BMI Rap/Hip-Hop Awards. Sessions teamed up with Stallion again on, Girls in the Hood, which peaked at #28 on Billboard's Hot 100 and was certified 2× Platinum. I'm a King (co-written and performed by Sessions and Stallion) was featured in the film, Coming 2 America, and released as the lead single on the film's soundtrack.

Additional collaborations include Sessions' co-write, Muwop, recorded by Latto (featuring Gucci Mane) which went platinum in 2022 as well as composing songs and being executive producer on Iggy Azalea's, 2021 album The End of an Era. Sessions released singles that featured artists such as  Royce Da 5'9" on Still Alive, Rick Ross on Penthouse Prayers, and Benny the Butcher and Freddie Gibbs on Gold Rolex.

Discography

References

Living people
Rappers from Dallas
Def Jam Recordings artists
Songwriters from Texas
Grammy Award winners
Year of birth missing (living people)